Alexander Gordon (1781–1873) was a British officer during the Napoleonic Wars. He was commissioned a captain in the 15th Hussars and he fought in the Peninsular War. His correspondence during the Corunna Campaign were collated and published early in the 20th century.

Biography
Gordon was the son of George Gordon, 3rd Earl of Aberdeen and his mistress Penelope Dearing. His commission was purchased for him in 1803. After service in the Peninsular War he sold his commission in 1811 on his marriage to Albinia Elizabeth Cumberland. He was acknowledged by the 3rd Earl as being his son and was provided for in the Earl's will. He died at Ellon in Aberdeenshire on 21 March 1873.

Family
On 20 May 1811 Gordon married Albinia Elizabeth, daughter of Richard Cumberland and granddaughter of George Hobart, 3rd Earl of Buckinghamshire.  They had five sons and four daughters:

George John Robert Gordon, JP, DL, of Ellon Castle, Aberdeenshire (1812–1912) - British diplomat in Sweden and Germany who married Rosa Justina Young and had two sons and one daughter:
Cosmo Frederick Maitland Gordon (b.1843) - naval officer
Alicia Albinia Georgiana Gordon (1845–1930) - married as a Gräfin von Dillen−Spiering
Arthur John Lewis Gordon (1847–1918) - British diplomat, married 1885 Caroline Augusta Hamilton Gordon, daughter of Colonel Sir Alexander Hamilton Gordon (1817–1890)
Sophia Albinia Georgiana Gordon, (b.1813)
Bertie Edward Murray Gordon (1813–1870) - army officer who married Katherine Alicia Hacket
Richard Louis Hobart Gordon (1815–1835) - naval officer who drowned in the wreck of HMS Challenger
Harriet Albinia Louisa Gordon (1816–1854) who married Charles Elphinstone-Dalrymple, son of Sir Robert Dalrymple-Horn-Elphinstone, 1st Bart., and had one son:
William Robert Elphinstone-Dalrymple (b.1854) - army officer
William Everard Alphonso Gordon, CB (b.1817) - naval officer
Catherine Louisa Caroline Gordon, (b.1819)
Charles Alexander Boswell Gordon (b.1823) - army officer who married Eweretta Rosa Johnstone
Eleanor Vere Gordon (1825–1916) - artist and author who married the Rev. and Hon. Richard Cavendish Boyle, son of Edmund Boyle, 8th Earl of Cork, and had three sons and one daughter:
Isabella Albinia Boyle
Hamilton Richard Boyle (b.1848) - army officer
Charles John Boyle (b.1849) - army officer
Algernon Edward Richard Boyle, JP - (b.1854)

Bibliography
 "This is a valuable eye-witness account of an often overlooked campaign by a perceptive and informed professional observer".

Notes

References

1781 births
1873 deaths
15th The King's Hussars officers
British Army personnel of the Napoleonic Wars